
Year 302 (CCCII) was a common year starting on Thursday of the Julian calendar. At the time, it was known as the Year of the Consulship of Constantius and Valerius or, less frequently, year 1055 Ab urbe condita. The denomination 302 for this year has been used since the early medieval period, when the Anno Domini calendar era became the prevalent method in Europe for naming years.

Events 
 By place 

 Roman Empire 
 Emperor Diocletian persecutes the Manichaeans, accusing them of being a Persian fifth column.
 Caesar Galerius wins his second victory over the Carpi.
 An invasion of Gaul by the Alemannic Lingones almost traps Caesar Constantius I between the enemy and the walls of a town. Constantius himself is carried onto the wall via a crane. However, within the same day, Constantius sallies forth from the walls and defeats the enemy in a major battle.

 Persia 
 Narseh, ruler (Shahanshah) of the Sassanid Empire, dies after a 9-year reign. He is succeeded by his son Hormizd II.

 By topic 

 Art and Science 

 Iamblichus of Chalcis writes a treatise on magic and the occult.

 Religion 

 Gregory the Illuminator is consecrated as Patriarch of Armenia by Leontius of Caesarea.

Births 
 Sun Sheng (or Anguo), Chinese historian (d. 373)

Deaths 
 Cao Huan, Chinese emperor of the Cao Wei state (b. 246)
 Narseh (or Narses), ruler of the Sassanid Empire
 Sima Jiong (or Jingzhi), Chinese prince and regent

References